SS Tottenham was a British ship, that wrecked on the southern fringing reef of Juan de Nova Island in 1911.

References

http://teesbuiltships.co.uk/view.php?a1PageSize=20&year_built=&builder=&a1Order=Sorter_name&a1Dir=ASC&a1Page=272&ref=165102&vessel=TOTTENHAM

1901 ships
Ships built on the River Tees
Steamships of the United Kingdom
Merchant ships of the United Kingdom
Shipwrecks in the Indian Ocean
Maritime incidents in 1911
Juan de Nova Island